Belgharia High School is one of the oldest schools in Belgharia suburb of Kolkata, founded in 1872.

References

External links
Belgharia High School

High schools and secondary schools in Kolkata
1872 establishments in British India
Educational institutions established in 1872